German submarine U-317 was a Type VIIC/41 U-boat of Nazi Germany's Kriegsmarine during World War II.

The submarine was laid down on 12 September 1942 at the Flender Werke at Lübeck, launched on 1 September 1943, and commissioned on 23 October 1943 under the command of Oberleutnant zur See Peter Rahlf.

Design
German Type VIIC/41 submarines were preceded by the heavier Type VIIC submarines. U-317 had a displacement of  when at the surface and  while submerged. She had two shafts and two  propellers.

U-317 was fitted with five  torpedo tubes (four fitted at the bow and one at the stern), fourteen torpedoes, one  SK C/35 naval gun, (220 rounds), one  Flak M42 and two  C/30 anti-aircraft guns. The boat had a complement of between forty-four and sixty.

Service history

 U-317 served with the 4th U-boat Flotilla for training, and later with the 9th U-boat Flotilla in front-line service from 1 to 26 June 1944.

U-317s first patrol took her from Kiel in Germany to Egersund in Norway, between 31 May and 2 June 1944. She then sailed from Egersund on 21 June for her second and final patrol.

U-317 was sunk with all hands on 26 June 1944, northeast of the Shetland islands, in position , by depth charges dropped by a Liberator anti-submarine bomber of No. 86 Squadron RAF.

References

Bibliography

External links

German Type VIIC/41 submarines
U-boats commissioned in 1943
U-boats sunk in 1944
U-boats sunk by British aircraft
World War II submarines of Germany
World War II shipwrecks in the Norwegian Sea
1943 ships
Ships built in Lübeck
U-boats sunk by depth charges
Ships lost with all hands
Maritime incidents in June 1944